Associação Esportiva Social e Recreativa Riopardense, commonly known as Riopardense, is a Brazilian football club based in Rio Pardo, Rio Grande do Sul state.

History
The club was founded on July 27, 2009. They competed in the Copa FGF in 2010, when they were eliminated in the First Stage of the competition.

Stadium
Associação Esportiva Social e Recreativa Riopardense play their home games at Estádio Municipal Amaro Cassep. The stadium has a maximum capacity of 1,500 people.

References

Association football clubs established in 2009
Football clubs in Rio Grande do Sul
2009 establishments in Brazil